Stefan Lukačević (born 9 November 1995) is a Montenegrin football midfielder who plays for OFK Mladost Donja Gorica.

Club career
He had a spell in Serbia with Metalac Gornji Milanovac and joined Zeta in 2018.

References

External links
 
 
 Stefan Lukačević profile & stats at Football Association of Montenegro

1995 births
Living people
Footballers from Podgorica
Association football midfielders
Montenegrin footballers
FK Budućnost Podgorica players
FK Bratstvo Cijevna players
FK Metalac Gornji Milanovac players
FK Zeta players
Montenegrin Second League players
Serbian SuperLiga players
Montenegrin expatriate footballers
Expatriate footballers in Serbia
Montenegrin expatriate sportspeople in Serbia